The Buffalo Terminal Subdivision is a railroad line owned by CSX Transportation in the U.S. State of New York. The line runs from Churchville, New York, to Hamburg, New York.

History
It became part of New York Central and Conrail through leases, mergers and takeovers, and was assigned to CSX Transportation in the 1999 breakup of Conrail.

See also
 List of CSX Transportation lines

References

CSX Transportation lines
Rail infrastructure in New York (state)
New York Central Railroad lines